The following television stations broadcast on digital or analog channel 26 in Canada:

 CBUFT-DT in Vancouver, British Columbia
 CFTF-DT-10 in Baie-Saint-Paul, Quebec
 CHAU-DT-4 in Chandler, Quebec
 CHCO-TV in St. Andrews, New Brunswick
 CHWI-DT-60 in Windsor, Ontario
 CICO-DT-53 in Belleville, Ontario
 CIII-DT-4 in Owen Sound, Ontario
 CIVM-DT in Montreal, Quebec
 CKWS-TV-2 in Prescott, Ontario

26 TV stations in Canada